Kaitlin Young (born September 15, 1985) is an American mixed martial artist who currently competes in the lightweight division. A professional mixed martial artist since 2007, Young has also competed for EliteXC, Invicta Fighting Championships, and Professional Fighters League (PFL)

Biography
Young began training in martial arts at age 14, where she explored her interest in taekwondo and earned a black belt.

After attending a taekwondo national conference, Young discovered Thai boxing. She signed up for classes at the Minnesota Martial Arts Academy after attending a Thai boxing event.

Graduating at the top of her class from Centennial High School in 2004, Young subsequently enrolled in the University of Minnesota, with a major in kinesiology.

Mixed martial arts career
Young rose to fame after winning the one-night 2007 HOOKnSHOOT Women's Grand Prix with three knockouts in a combined time of just 1:45.

She then faced Sarah Schneider at Tuff-N-Uff: "Thompson vs. Troyer" on February 1, 2008, but was defeated by a second-round armbar.

On May 31, 2008, Young was defeated by Gina Carano at EliteXC: Primetime on CBS after the second round when the ringside physician declared her unable to continue.

Young returned to MMA competition on December 11, 2009, but lost to Shana Olsen via second-round technical knock out. Olsen had missed weight for the fight.

Young entered the Freestyle Cage Fighting Women's Bantamweight Grand Prix at FCF 39 on January 30, 2010 in Shawnee, Oklahoma. She was defeated by Jennifer Tate in the second round of their quarterfinal bout.

Young was set to face Jamie Seaton in the co-main event at Crowbar MMA: "Fall Brawl" on September 11, 2010, but Seaton withdrew from the fight. Young was then matched up against Liz Carmouche, but the fight was cancelled after Young signed on to take part in the filming of the Ultimate Women Challenge reality show. After the show never made it to air, Young and 6 other contestants sued the producers, claiming they were never paid.

During the filming of the Ultimate Women Challenge, Young faced Julie Kedzie on September 24, 2010. She defeated Kedzie by split decision.

Young faced Kedzie again in a five-round title rematch at Jackson's MMA Series 4 on April 9, 2011 in Albuquerque, New Mexico. She was defeated by unanimous decision.

Young was scheduled to face Jan Finney in the main event of Freestyle Cage Fighting 49 on October 1. However, Finney withdrew from the fight and Young faced Liz Carreiro instead. She defeated Carreiro by TKO late in the first round.

Young agreed to face Milana Dudieva at ProFC 37 on November 9, 2011 in Ufa, Russia. However, she withdrew from the fight on October 30 due to complications in securing a visa.

Young faced Anna Barone at "Downtown Showdown 2" on January 6, 2012 in Minneapolis, Minnesota. Barone missed weight, but the fight proceeded and Young defeated Barone by TKO when the doctor stopped the fight after round two.

Invicta FC
Young faced Leslie Smith at Invicta FC 1: Coenen vs. Ruyssen on April 28, 2012. Their bout ended in a split draw and was named fight of the night.

Young faced Liz Carmouche at Invicta FC 2: Baszler vs. McMann on July 28, 2012. She was defeated by submission due to a rear-naked choke in the second round.

Young was next set to face Sarah Kaufman at Invicta FC 3: Penne vs. Sugiyama. However, Kaufman suffered an injury and Young instead faced Leslie Smith in a rematch. She was defeated by TKO in the second round.

Young was scheduled to face Amanda Nunes at Invicta FC 5: Penne vs. Waterson on April 5, 2013. However, Nunes sustained an arm injury and Young instead faced Lauren Taylor. Young lost the fight via unanimous decision.

In April 2016 it was announced by Invicta FC that Young would be joining their staff as a fight matchmaker, working alongside Julie Kedzie.

After over four years of absence from competition, Young fought Reina Miura at Rizin 12 on August 12, 2018. Yong won the fight via unanimous decision.

Young was scheduled to face Zarah Fairn Dos Santos on November 16, 2018 at Invicta FC 32: Spencer vs. Sorenson. However due to visa issues Dos Santos was replaced by Sarah Patterson and the fight proceeded at 150-pound catchweight affair to accommodate Patterson. At the weigh-ins, Patterson weighed in at 154.5 pounds, 3.5 pound over the catchweight fight limit of 150. She was fined 25 percent of her purse, which went to her opponent Young. Young won the fight via technical knockout in round one. In June 2019, Young defeated Faith McMah by TKO in the third round.

Young faced Pam Sorenson on August 9, 2019 at Invicta FC 36: Sorenson vs. Young for the vacant Invicta featherweight title. Young lost the fight in a five round unanimous decision.

Professional Fighters League
On February 25, 2021, news surfaced that Young had signed with Professional Fighters League and is expected to compete in the women's lightweight tournament of season 2021.

Young made her debut against Cindy Dandois at PFL 3 on May 6, 2021. She won the bout via unanimous decision.

Young faced Mariana Morais on June 25, 2021 at PFL 6. She lost the close bout via split decision.

Young was scheduled to face Marina Mokhnatkina on August 19, 2021 at PFL 8. Young was pulled from the bout a day before the event due to undisclosed reasons.

Young faced Julia Budd on October 27, 2021 at PFL 10. She lost the bout in decisive fashion via unanimous decision.

Young faced Kayla Harrison on July 1, 2022 at PFL 6. Young lost the bout, with the referee stoppage at the 2:35 mark of the first round.

Championships and accomplishments

Muay Thai
 2007 TBA-SA Amateur 135lb North American Muay Thai Champion

Mixed martial arts
HOOKnSHOOT
 2007 HOOKnSHOOT Women's Grand Prix Champion
Invicta FC
Fight of the Night (one time) vs. Leslie Smith

Mixed martial arts record

|-
|Loss
|align=center| 12–13–1
|Kayla Harrison
|TKO (punches) 
|PFL 6
|
|align=center|1
|align=center|2:35
|Atlanta, Georgia, United States
|
|-
|Loss
|align=center| 12–12–1
|Julia Budd
|Decision (unanimous)
|PFL 10 
|
|align=center|3
|align=center|5:00
|Hollywood, Florida, United States
|
|-
| Loss
|align=center| 12–11–1
|Mariana Morais
|Decision (split)
|PFL 6
|
|align=center|3
|align=center|5:00
|Atlantic City, New Jersey, United States
|
|-
|Win
|align=center|12–10–1
|Cindy Dandois
|Decision (unanimous)
|PFL 3 
|
|align=center| 3
|align=center| 5:00
|Atlantic City, New Jersey, United States
|
|-
| Win
|align=center| 11–10–1
| Latoya Walker
| Decision (unanimous)
| Invicta FC 41: Morandin vs. Ruiz
| 
|align=center| 3
|align=center| 5:00
|Kansas City, Kansas, United States
|
|-
| Loss
|align=center| 10–10–1
| Pam Sorenson
| Decision (unanimous)
| Invicta FC 36: Sorenson vs. Young
| 
|align=center| 5
|align=center| 5:00
|Kansas City, Kansas, United States
| For the vacant Invicta FC Featherweight Championship
|-
| Win
|align=center| 10–9–1
| Faith McMah
| TKO (punches)
| Invicta FC 35: Bennett vs. Rodriguez II
| 
|align=center| 3
|align=center| 3:52
|Kansas City, Kansas, United States
| 
|-
| Win
|align=center| 9–9–1
| Sarah Patterson
| TKO (leg kick and punches)
| Invicta FC 32: Spencer vs. Sorenson
| 
|align=center| 1
|align=center| 1:25
| Shawnee, Oklahoma, United States
| 
|-
| Win
|align=center| 8–9–1
| Reina Miura
| Decision (unanimous)
| Rizin 12
| 
|align=center| 3
|align=center| 5:00
| Nagoya, Japan
| 
|-
| Loss
|align=center| 7–9–1
| Raquel Pa'aluhi
| Decision (unanimous)
| Invicta FC 9: Honchak vs. Hashi
| 
|align=center| 3
|align=center| 5:00
| Davenport, Iowa, United States
| 
|-
| Loss
|align=center| 7–8–1
| Lauren Murphy
| Decision (unanimous)
| Invicta FC 5: Penne vs. Waterson
| 
|align=center| 3
|align=center| 5:00
| Kansas City, Missouri, United States
| 
|-
| Loss
| align=center| 7–7–1
| Leslie Smith
| TKO (punches)
| Invicta FC 3: Penne vs. Sugiyama
| 
| align=center| 2
| align=center| 2:19
| Kansas City, Kansas, United States
|
|-
| Loss
| align=center| 7–6–1
| Liz Carmouche
| Submission (rear-naked choke)
| Invicta FC 2: Baszler vs. McMann
| 
| align=center| 2
| align=center| 3:34
| Kansas City, Kansas, United States
|
|-
| Draw
| align=center| 7–5–1
| Leslie Smith
| Draw (split)
| Invicta FC 1: Coenen vs. Ruyssen
| 
| align=center| 3
| align=center| 5:00
| Kansas City, Kansas, United States
| 
|-
| Win
| align=center | 7–5
| Anna Barone
| TKO (doctor stoppage)
| Driller Promotions / SEG - Downtown Showdown 2
| 
| align=center | 2
| align=center | 5:00
| Minneapolis, Minnesota, United States
| 
|-
| Win
| align=center | 6–5
| Liz Carreiro
| TKO (punches)
| FCF 49: Fight Strong For The Cure
| 
| align=center | 1
| align=center | 4:47
| Shawnee, Oklahoma, United States
| 
|-
| Loss
| align=center | 5–5
| Julie Kedzie
| Decision (unanimous)
| Jackson's MMA Series 4
| 
| align=center | 5
| align=center | 5:00
| Albuquerque, New Mexico, United States
| 
|-
| Win
| align=center | 5–4
| Julie Kedzie
| Decision (split)
| Ultimate Women Challenge
| 
| align=center | 3
| align=center | 3:00
| St. George, Utah, United States
| 
|-
| Loss
| align=center | 4–4
| Jennifer Tate
| Submission (armbar)
| Freestyle Cage Fighting 39
| 
| align=center | 2
| align=center | 2:35
| Shawnee, Oklahoma, United States
| 
|-
| Loss
| align=center | 4–3
| Shana Olsen
| TKO (punches and elbows)
| Ironman MMA
| 
| align=center | 2
| align=center | 1:52
| Welch, Minnesota, United States
| 
|-
| Loss
| align=center | 4–2
| Gina Carano
| TKO (doctor stoppage)
| EliteXC: Primetime
| 
| align=center | 2
| align=center | 3:00
| Newark, New Jersey, United States
| 
|-
| Loss
| align=center | 4–1
| Sarah Schneider
| Submission (armbar)
| Tuff-N-Uff: Thompson vs. Troyer
| 
| align=center | 2
| align=center | 0:35
| Las Vegas, Nevada, United States
| 
|-
| Win
| align=center | 4–0
| Patti Lee
| TKO (knee to the body)
| rowspan=3|HOOKnSHOOT - BodogFight 2007 Women's Grand Prix
| rowspan=3|
| align=center | 1
| align=center | 0:53
| rowspan=3|Evansville, Indiana, United States
| 
|-
| Win
| align=center | 3–0
| Miesha Tate
| KO (head kick)
| align=center | 1
| align=center | 0:30
| 
|-
| Win
| align=center | 2–0
| Suzy Smith
| KO (knees)
| align=center | 1
| align=center | 0:22
| 
|-
| Win
| align=center | 1–0
| Lindsey Frandrop
| TKO (body kicks and punches)
| Brutaal - Fight Night
| 
| align=center | 2
| align=center | 0:26
| Maplewood, Minnesota, United States
|

See also
 List of female mixed martial artists

References

External links
 
 Kaitlin Young at PFL
 
 Kaitlin Young at AwakeningFighters.com

1985 births
Living people
University of Minnesota College of Education and Human Development alumni
American female mixed martial artists
Bantamweight mixed martial artists
Mixed martial artists utilizing Muay Thai
Mixed martial artists utilizing taekwondo
Mixed martial artists utilizing Brazilian jiu-jitsu
Female Muay Thai practitioners
American female kickboxers
American Muay Thai practitioners
American female taekwondo practitioners
American practitioners of Brazilian jiu-jitsu
Female Brazilian jiu-jitsu practitioners
People from Circle Pines, Minnesota
21st-century American women